Monique Grotto Olsen (born September 2, 1990) is a Brazilian fashion model and MTV Brazil VJ.

Olsen's agencies include/have been Ford Brazil (Mother Agency); Mega Models - Miami; Women Management; Women Management - Milan; Traffic Models; Premier Model Management; Saturo Japan, INC; and Mega Models Brasil.

Career
Olsen has appeared in ad campaigns for D&G, Agilita, Huis Clos, Someday and Stussy.  Olsen has graced the pages of publications like Vogue, Elle, L'Officiel, Marie Claire, Glamour, and others.  Olsen has also walked the runways for Calvin Klein, Dolce & Gabbana, Marc Jacobs, Tommy Hilfiger, Nanette Lepore, Heatherette, Diane von Furstenberg, Vivienne Westwood, Vera Wang and others.

Olsen was runner-up in the "Riachuelo Mega Models 2003" contest; she was also one of the models chosen for Vogue Italia's "Models to Watch for in 2006".  She appeared on the cover of "D" issue #449 (2005).She has said that when she is done with modeling, she would like to become a fashion journalist.

References

External links 

1990 births
Living people
People from Lages
Brazilian people of German descent
Brazilian female models